The 1983 Paris–Nice was the 41st edition of the Paris–Nice road cycling stage race and was held from 9 March to 16 March 1983. The race started in Issy-les-Moulineaux and finished at the Col d'Èze. The race was won by Sean Kelly of the Sem–France Loire team.

Route

General classification

References

1983
1983 in road cycling
1983 in French sport
March 1983 sports events in Europe
1983 Super Prestige Pernod